The 2022–23 season is the fourth in the history of Western United Football Club. In addition to the domestic league, Western United also participated in the Australia Cup for the second time.

Review

Background
The 2021–22 season saw the club finish in third place, its highest ever finish and compete in the finals for the second time. The club then went on to appear in and win its first ever grand final on 28 May 2022 against Melbourne City.

Players

First-team squad

Transfers

Transfers in

From youth squad

Transfers out

Contract extensions

Pre-season and friendlies

Competitions

Overview

A-League Men

League table

Results summary

Results by round

Matches

Australia Cup

Statistics

Appearances and goals
Includes all competitions. Players with no appearances not included in the list.

Disciplinary record
Includes all competitions. The list is sorted by squad number when total cards are equal. Players with no cards not included in the list.

Clean sheets
Includes all competitions. The list is sorted by squad number when total clean sheets are equal. Numbers in parentheses represent games where both goalkeepers participated and both kept a clean sheet; the number in parentheses is awarded to the goalkeeper who was substituted on, whilst a full clean sheet is awarded to the goalkeeper who was on the field at the start and end of play. Goalkeepers with no clean sheets not included in the list.

See also
 2022–23 in Australian soccer
 List of Western United FC seasons

References

External links
 Western United official website

Western United FC seasons
2022–23 A-League Men season by team